Potočani may refer to the following villages:

Bosnia and Herzegovina

 Potočani, Bugojno, in the municipality of Bugojno
 Potočani, Doboj, in the municipality of Doboj
 Potočani, Livno, in the municipality of Livno
 Potočani, Novi Travnik, in the municipality of Novi Travnik
 Potočani, Odžak and Vukosavlje, split between the municipalities of Odžak and Vukosavlje
 Potočani, Tešanj, in the municipality of Tešanj

Croatia
 Potočani, Velika, in the municipality of Velika
 Potočani, Đulovac, in the municipality of Đulovac

See also
 Potočari (disambiguation)